The House of Representatives is the lower house of the bicameral Parliament of Somaliland, with the House of Elders being the upper house.

The interim House of Representatives was formed in 1991, and driven by Somali National Movement. Somaliland National Charter of 1993 established bicameral legislature. The current House of Representatives was formed following parliamentary elections held on 29 September 2005, which resulted in a strong combined majority for the opposition Kulmiye and UCID parties. It has a total of 82 members. The latter include the Speaker of the House, Bashe Mohamed Farah. MPs are elected in six multi-member constituencies, using the party-list proportional representation system for a five-year term.

The constitution gives the House broad legislative powers over financial matters. Its most potent check on executive power is its right to approve, reject, or amend the government's annual budget and the right to inspect annual expenditure reports that the executive is obligated to prepare. The formation of the parliament in 2005 was the most important step in establishing a constitutionally-based, democratic governmental system in Somaliland.

Electoral history

2005

2021

Subcommittees
 Standing and disciplinary sub-committee
 Economic, finance and commercial sub-committee
 Social affairs and religion sub-committee
 Environment, livestock, agriculture and natural resources sub-committee
 Internal affairs, security and defence sub-committee
 Foreign policy, International relation and national planning sub-committee
 Constitutional, judiciary, justice and Human rights sub-committee
 Care and protection of public properties sub-committee

List of Parliaments 
 1st Somaliland Parliament (1991–1993) – Majority party: No Party System
 2nd Somaliland Parliament (1993–1997) – Majority party: No Party System
 3rd Somaliland Parliament (1997–2005) – Majority party: No Party System
 4th Somaliland Parliament (November 2005 – 2021) – Majority party: UDUB (39%), Kulmiye Party (34%)
5th Somaliland Parliament (June 2021–May 2026) – Majority party: Waddani (37.23%)

Speakers

Gallery

See also
 History of Somaliland
 Legislative branch
 List of national legislatures

References

Somaliland
Government of Somaliland
1991 establishments in Somaliland